Westover Manor is a historic house located in Westover Hills, Texas. It was added to the National Register of Historic Places on December 15, 1988.

See also
National Register of Historic Places listings in Tarrant County, Texas
Recorded Texas Historic Landmarks in Tarrant County

References

External links
 
  – State of Texas
  – Independent

National Register of Historic Places in Tarrant County, Texas
Houses in Tarrant County, Texas
Houses on the National Register of Historic Places in Texas
Recorded Texas Historic Landmarks